The  is an annual marathon sporting event for men and women over the classic distance of 42.195 kilometres which is held in mid November in Kobe, Hyōgo Prefecture, Japan. 

Before of race start of first edition 2011, a stone monument was unveiled to commemorate the first ever marathon held in Japan, the Marathon Great Race held in Kobe on March 21, 1909.

History 

The race was first held in 2011.

The 2020 edition of the race was cancelled due to the coronavirus pandemic, with all registrants automatically receiving full refunds.

Course 
The race begins in front of Kobe City Hall, passes through Takatori district, and after crossing and turning around in the West side of Akashi Kaikyo Bridge heads for to Komagayashi / Wada Cape area, where the finish line is located near the citizen's square of Port Island.

Winners
Key:

Multiple wins

By country

References

External links 
 Official website

Marathons in Japan
Recurring sporting events established in 2011
Sport in Kobe